Havasupai Trail is the main trail to Supai, Arizona, and to Havasu Falls. There are other trails, such as the Topocoba, Moqui and Kirby trails. However, these other trails are not maintained. As far back as 1976, they were described as ranging from "in poor repair" to "primitive, dangerous foot trails." Special permission is required to use any such trail.

Trail
The trailhead is located at Hualapai Hilltop (which is located at the end of BIA Road 18), where there is a large parking lot, a heli-pad and permanent toilets that include amenities such as toilet paper and hand sanitizer. The trail can be traveled by foot, by horseback, or on a mule service the Havasupai offer. The mule service can also be purchased for luggage/packs only, which allows an easier hike and the ability to bring down more luxuries. The trail starts out at the hilltop, where it switch-backs down the side of the canyon for about ¾ of a mile. This is by far the most difficult part of the trail, and is much more difficult on the way back up.

 The switch-backs stop when the plateau is reached, a point that is marked by a small rest area made from rocks and cement. The trail then leads down off the plateau into a dry streambed. Caution should always be taken when entering a dry streambed in any desert, as it is a prime place for flash floods. The trail follows the streambed down. The trail meanders down this streambed for approximately  until the canyon starts to open up into another canyon. This spot is marked by a dramatic increase in vegetation. Follow the trail down the new canyon to the left.

The trail will take you next to the stream where you will encounter a bridge. The trail crosses the bridge, thus entering into the town of Supai.  Stay on the trail and respect the fences as the land behind them is private property. The trail enters into the city main, where it first encounters a small convenience shop that sells drinks, ice cream, candy, food, and other snacks. Straight ahead lies a rodeo corral where there are usually bulls penned-up. The trail leads to the town square where all the public buildings are located. The trail then goes through the city along the canyon wall to the right. The trail makes an obvious right-hand turn and enters into more vegetation. After leaving the vegetation the trail follows the canyon to the left.

 After completely circling the small canyon (this is where Navajo Falls used to be located and now where two new unnamed falls are located since a large flood changed the area in 2008, Navajo Falls) the trail starts to head down towards the creek, ultimately crossing it twice, over two small separate bridges. After crossing the bridges, the trail leads to the top of Havasu Falls. It then moves toward the canyon wall on the left, ultimately hugging it. On the right side of the trail is the cliff that is next to Havasu Falls, where there is a good spot for photographs of the falls.  There is a hand rail on the right side to help prevent falls. The trail heads down and enters into the campgrounds.  The campgrounds are about half a mile (nearly a kilometer) long and offer many campsites, ranging from group to single size.  There is a small spring located in the middle of the campgrounds which offers fresh water (the Tribe recommends treating the water, such as with boiling, filtering, etc.). The campground has many composting toilets and picnic tables. The Tribe asks to please pack out all trash and does not permit campfires. The trail then goes through the campgrounds and ends at Mooney Falls.

References

External links
 Official Havasupai Tribe Website

Trail
Historic trails and roads in Arizona
Protected areas of Coconino County, Arizona
Grand Canyon, South Rim